97E, pronounced "ninety seven echo" was the Military Occupational Specialty (MOS) code designating a Human Intelligence Collector in the U.S. Army, formerly known as Interrogator Prisoner of War.  97Es, or "Echoes" as they are commonly called, screen human intelligence sources and documents for priority information, conduct liaison meetings, interviews, and interrogation during wartime. Until recently, all 97Es were required to be proficient in a foreign language, which was often learned at the Defense Language Institute.  Since the beginning of the wars in Afghanistan and Iraq, Echoes have proven to be in extremely short supply and this requirement has been waived. Currently, the MOS code has been re-designated to 35M.

The Human Intelligence Collector is responsible for supervising and performing information collection operations. The duties of these collectors include preparing and editing appropriate intelligence and administrative reports, assisting in screening of human intelligence sources and documents, and conducting tactical interrogations (often in a foreign language) of prisoners of war, enemy deserters, insurgents,  civilians, and refugees to obtain information necessary for the development of military intelligence reports.

Training for "Echoes" is done at Fort Huachuca, Arizona.  This initial training lasts 18 weeks, during which soldiers learn to prepare intelligence reports, analyze aerial photographs, and prepare aerial and satellite observations. This training culminates in a field exercise spanning four days.  During this last phase of training, soldiers utilize their training to perform missions in real world scenarios.

See also
09L
List of United States Army MOS

References

United States Army Military Occupational Specialty
Combat support occupations
Human intelligence (information gathering)